Gustavo Ramón Mencia Ávalos (born 6 July 1988) is a  Paraguayan footballer who plays as a centre back. He was born in Presidente Franco, and currently plays for Deportes Antofagasta in the Chilean Primera División and the Paraguay national football team.

International career
On 14 November 2012, Mencia made his debut for the Paraguay national football team and also scored his first goal for his  in a Friendly match against Guatemala.

External links
 
 clublibertad.com.py

1988 births
Living people
Paraguayan footballers
Paraguay international footballers
Paraguayan expatriate footballers
Club Libertad footballers
Club Atlético 3 de Febrero players
Sportivo Luqueño players
Club Olimpia footballers
Universidad de Concepción footballers
Chilean Primera División players
Paraguayan Primera División players
Expatriate footballers in Chile
Paraguayan expatriates in Chile
Association football fullbacks